Richard Matthew Bannister (born 16 March 1957) is a British media executive and broadcaster.

Early career
After attending King Edward VII School, Sheffield, he graduated in law at the University of Nottingham in 1978, and joined BBC Radio Nottingham as a trainee reporter and subsequently the presenter of its speech-based breakfast show, Morning Report. It was here that he first met Trevor Dann, whom he subsequently worked with at BBC Radio 1.

He first worked for Radio 1 as a presenter of its news programme Newsbeat between 1983 and 1985. He worked for Capital Radio as a journalist in the early 1980s, before returning as head of News and Talks, after leaving Radio 1. He was also co-presenter with Sarah Ward of Capital Radio's The Way It Is.

Managerial career

Bannister first established himself as a name in the radio industry in the late 1980s and early 1990s as Managing Editor of GLR (Greater London Radio), the BBC's local radio station for London. Here he worked for the first time with Chris Evans, who was pioneering many of the ideas which would later win him greater success and much controversy at Radio 1, and also employed a number of the more musically credible DJs from Radio 1's past, such as Annie Nightingale, Tommy Vance, Janice Long and Johnnie Walker. The line-up also included Danny Baker, Emma Freud and Chris Morris.

After working for two years in the BBC corporate centre on projects related to the renewal of the BBC's Royal Charter, in 1993 Bannister was chosen as the new controller for BBC Radio 1, replacing Johnny Beerling who had worked at the station since its inception in 1967. Many of the DJs, producers and other staff at Radio One had grown old with the station, as had the audience. Keen to return the station to its original purpose for "young listeners", Bannister overhauled the staff, resulting in many presenters either resigning or being sacked and replacing them with new presenters. Over the next few years the station lost approximately 5 million listeners.

The Britpop explosion proved the success of Bannister's strategy: the bands he had championed a year or two earlier, when they were comparatively obscure and marginal, were now part of the mainstream, and Radio 1 was booming again.  Chris Evans, who had become a hugely popular national figure as breakfast DJ, was the figurehead of this boom, but eventually things went sour; in January 1997 Evans resigned after Bannister refused to allow him to waive his Friday show, to concentrate on his TV show TFI Friday. After Mark Radcliffe and Marc Riley had an unsuccessful stint on the breakfast show, the team of Kevin Greening and Zoe Ball were hosting the breakfast show when Bannister left Radio 1 in 1998 (Ball would subsequently host the show on her own).

In the autumn of 1996 Bannister was appointed director of Radio, a post which gave him responsibility for all the national BBC radio networks other than Five Live. He remained controller of Radio 1 alongside this until March 1998, when he was succeeded by Andy Parfitt. In 1999, Bannister was appointed chief executive of BBC Production, responsible for all non-news programme-making on English television, radio and online. He oversaw production centres in London, Manchester, Birmingham and Bristol. When John Birt announced he was stepping down as BBC director general, Bannister lost out to Greg Dyke. After a short stint in 2000 as director of marketing and communications, he subsequently returned to radio presenting on BBC 5 Live, Radio 4 and the World Service.

Return to broadcasting
In October 2000 Bannister resigned from the BBC to return to broadcasting. From 2003 to 2005 he had his own late night talk show on BBC Radio 5 Live. He also deputised for other presenters on the station as well as on programmes on Radio 4 such as Broadcasting House and Saturday PM. Since 2006 he has presented an obituary programme on Radio 4 called Last Word and between 2008 and 2018 also hosted Outlook on the BBC World Service. He has also sat in for Jeremy Vine on his lunchtime Radio 2 show. He is chairman of the independent production company Wire Free Productions.  In August 2018, Bannister launched his own podcast, Folk on Foot , in which he walks and talks with leading folk performers in the landscapes that have inspired them. The podcast won the silver award in the Arts and Culture category at the British Podcast Awards 2019.  Folk on Foot producer Natalie Steed won gold as Best Music Producer at the Audio Production Awards 2019, when Bannister was nominated as Best Music Presenter.

On 20 July 2011 Bannister was awarded an honorary doctorate from his alma mater, the University of Nottingham. On 19 November 2019 he was awarded an honorary doctorate of arts from Sheffield Hallam University.

He is a Fellow of the Radio Academy.

Personal life
Bannister married his first wife, the radio and TV presenter Amanda Walker, in 1984. Their daughter Jessica was born later the same year. In 1988 Amanda drowned while swimming in the sea off the Spanish Costa Blanca during a family holiday. In 1989, Bannister married Shelagh Macleod, who later became senior vice-president of Legal and Business Affairs at the record company EMI. Their son Joe was born in 1990. Shelagh died of breast cancer in 2005. In 2007, he married Katherine Hood, a private equity investor. They were divorced in 2013.  He now lives with his partner, Kate McGuire.

References

External links
Last Word (BBC Radio 4)
Wire Free Productions
Matthew Bannister page on the Radio Rewindwebsite (includes biography, audio clip and an image)
www.folkonfoot.com
Matthew Bannister launches Folk on Foot podcast

1957 births
Alumni of the University of Nottingham
BBC Radio 1 controllers
Place of birth missing (living people)
BBC Radio 5 Live presenters
British radio DJs
British radio personalities
Living people
People educated at King Edward VII School, Sheffield
The Times people